The 1969 Cork Junior Hurling Championship was the 72nd staging of the Cork Junior Hurling Championship since its establishment by the Cork County Board.

The final was played on 30 November 1969 at the Castletownroche Grounds, between Kanturk and Mayfield, in what was their first ever meeting in the final. Kanturk won the match by 3-07 to 1-10 to claim their first ever championship title.

Results

Final

References

Cork Junior Hurling Championship
Cork Junior Hurling Championship